Badin Historic District is a national historic district located at Badin, Stanly County, North Carolina. The district encompasses 200 contributing buildings and 8 contributing sites in the company town of Badin.  They were built starting about 1912 and include residential, institutional, and commercial structures in Gothic Revival and Bungalow / American Craftsman style architecture. The community was developed by the Southern Aluminum Company of America, later Alcoa, with Badin developed for white residents. Notable buildings include the Badin Hospital (c. 1920), Badin Elementary School (c. 1920), 24 Henderson Street (c. 1916-1917), 28-30 Henderson Street duplex (1914), 27-33 Boyden Street quadruplex (1913-1914), Badin Club House (c. 1914) and Club House Annex (c. 1920), and Badin Baptist Church (c. 1925).

It was added to the National Register of Historic Places in 1983.

References

Historic districts on the National Register of Historic Places in North Carolina
Gothic Revival architecture in North Carolina
Buildings and structures in Stanly County, North Carolina
National Register of Historic Places in Stanly County, North Carolina